Novecento is an Italian band founded by Pino Nicolosi, Lino Nicolosi, Rossana Nicolosi, and Dora Nicolosi (née Carofiglio) in 1984. Their music has gone through a variety of genres, such as Italo disco (early work), synthpop, soft rock, pop rock, jazz, and funk. The band was active in the 1980s and the 1990s and became popular with the song "Cry" in 2008. 

Novecento's debut single, "Movin' On", sold more than 100,000 copies in 1984. The band went on to win the "Revelation of the Year" award during the national television event Azzurro 1984. They were signed to Italian Five Records and Baby Records, with international distribution via WEA, Warner Music, and ZTT. After recording seven albums, Novecento disbanded in 1997. They briefly reunited in 2002 and again in 2008, when they scored significant success with the single "Cry".

Members
 Dora Nicolosi – vocals
 Lino Nicolosi – guitar
 Pino Nicolosi – keyboards
 Rossana Nicolosi – bass

Discography

Albums
 1984: Novecento (WEA Italiana)
 1986: Dreamland (Art Records)
 1989: Shine (Five Records)
 1991: Leaving Now (Discomagic)
 1992: Necessary (Baby)
 1997: C'è un mondo che (Crisler Music)
 2002: Featuring
 2004: Dream of Peace, with Stanley Jordan
 2005: Together as One, with Gregg Kofi Brown
 2008: Secret
 2009: Drum 'n' Voice vol. 3 with Billy Cobham
 2009: Surrender, with Dominic Miller
 2011: Drum 'n' voice 1-2-3, with Billy Cobham
 2013: Sentieri notturni radio capítal, Novecento and friends
 2013: Through the Years

Compilation albums
 1990: The Best
 1993: Collection
 2003: Greatest Hits: The History

Singles
 1984: "Movin' On"/"Splendid Moment Together" (WEA Italiana)
 1984: "The Only One"/"Take a Chance" (WEA Italiana)
 1985: "Why Me"/"Someday" (WEA Italiana)
 1986: "Excessive Love"/"Single Reason" (Art)
 1986: "Dreamland Paradise"/"Near Me" (Art)
 1987: "Changes"/"Changes" (dub version) (CGD)
 1988: "Broadway"/"Mama Say Ye" (Five Record) (12")
 1989: "Darei"/"Tabù" (Five Record)
 1990: "I Need Love"/"I Need Love" (remix) (Hundred) (12")
 1991: "Heart on the Line"/"In the Rain" (Discomagic) (12")
 1992: "Day and Night" (Baby) (12")
 1993: "Marimba Day (Everybody Dancing)" (Baby) (12")
 1998: "Sogni che rimangono"
 2008: "Cry"
 2008: "Stop the Time"

References

Italian pop music groups
Italo disco groups
Musical groups from Milan